Joel Atiwag Pachao (born 29 July 1956) is a retired Filipino Episcopalian bishop. He is married to Precilla, with two adult children. He was elected Prime Bishop of the Episcopal Church in the Philippines on 16 May 2017.

Ecclesiastical career
Pachao graduated from St. Andrew's Theological Seminary in Quezon City, in 1979. He was ordained an Episcopal deacon on 24 June 1979, and a priest on 29 July 1981. He would serve in seven different locations for the following decade. He was elected Bishop of the Episcopal Diocese of Northern Central Philippines on 9 January 1992 and was consecrated at the Pro-Cathedral of the Resurrection in Baguio on 25 March 1992.

He was elected Prime Bishop of the Episcopal Church in the Philippines in an election held on 16 May 2017, at the second ballot, with other two candidates. He was enthroned later the same year at the Cathedral of St. Mary and St. John, in Quezon City, by incumbent Prime Bishop Renato Abibico.

References

External links
New Prime Bishop of the Episcopal Church in the Philippines, Anglican Communion News Service, 16 May 2017

1956 births
Living people
Filipino Episcopalians
20th-century Anglican bishops in Asia
21st-century Anglican bishops in Asia
Anglican bishops in the Philippines
Prime bishops of the Episcopal Church in the Philippines
Episcopal bishops of North Central Philippines
Filipino bishops